Yu Jae-gwon (born 22 June 1946) is a South Korean wrestler. He competed in the men's freestyle 74 kg at the 1976 Summer Olympics.

References

1946 births
Living people
South Korean male sport wrestlers
Olympic wrestlers of South Korea
Wrestlers at the 1976 Summer Olympics
Place of birth missing (living people)
20th-century South Korean people